Logan Mathers Brown (born March 5, 1998) is a Canadian-American professional ice hockey player currently playing for the  St. Louis Blues of the National Hockey League (NHL). He was selected in the first round, 11th overall, by the Ottawa Senators in the 2016 NHL Entry Draft.

Playing career

Youth
Brown played minor ice hockey in St. Louis and Indiana where his father, former NHL All-Star Jeff Brown, was coaching. He participated in the 2010 and 2011 Quebec International Pee-Wee Hockey Tournaments with his St. Louis team.

Junior

Niagara IceDogs
Brown was selected by the Niagara IceDogs of the OHL in the first round (sixth overall) in the 2014 OHL Priority Selection. However, he was traded to the Windsor Spitfires for six draft picks.

Windsor Spitfires
Brown skated at the NTDP Evaluation Camp, but ultimately decided to play in the Ontario Hockey League for the 2014–15 season. Brown appeared in his first game with the Windsor Spitfires on September 28, 2014, scoring a goal against Justin Nichols of the Guelph Storm in a 2–1 loss. On October 9, Brown registered his first multi-point game in the OHL, recording two assists in a 5–4 win over the Peterborough Petes. On January 4, Brown recorded his first multi-goal game, scoring twice in a 5–4 victory over the Mississauga Steelheads. Overall, Brown finished his rookie season with 17 goals and 43 points in 56 games, however, the rebuilding Spitfires finished in last place in the Western Conference and failed to qualify for the playoffs.

During the 2015–16 season, Brown set a career high with four points in a game, scoring a goal and earning three assists in a 5–3 win over the Flint Firebirds on January 21, 2016. Brown would record another four point game later in the season, again scoring a goal and adding three assists in a 6–4 win over the Kitchener Rangers on March 17. On February 28, Brown recorded the first hat-trick of his career, scoring three goals against Brandon Halverson of the Sault Ste. Marie Greyhounds in a 4–3 victory. Brown finished the season with 74 points, the second highest total on the team, as he scored 21 goals and added 53 assists in 59 games. Brown appeared in his first OHL playoff game on March 24, 2016, earning an assist in a 6–5 overtime loss to the Kitchener Rangers. In the fourth game of the series, with the Spitfires facing elimination, Brown recorded four assists in a 5–4 overtime win. Overall, Brown earned six points, all assists, in five playoff games.

Injuries plagued Brown's season in 2016–17, as he appeared in only 35 games, scoring 14 goals and 40 points. Brown did earn two hat-tricks during the season, the first one on October 13, 2016, scoring three goals against Connor Hicks of the Flint Firebirds in a 7–2 victory. His second hat-trick came on January 19 against the Ottawa 67's (who were coached by his father Jeff) in a 4–0 victory. In the playoffs, Brown earned four assists in seven games as the Spitfires lost to the London Knights in the first round of the playoffs. The Spitfires hosted the 2017 Memorial Cup, and Brown made his debut on May 19, being held off the score sheet in a 3–2 win over the Saint John Sea Dogs. In his second game, Brown scored his first Memorial Cup goal against Carl Stankowski of the Seattle Thunderbirds, and added two assists, in a 7–1 victory. In the Memorial Cup final, Brown earned two assists in a 4–3 victory over the Erie Otters.

After making the team out of training camp and beginning the 2017–18 season in the NHL with Ottawa, Brown returned to the Spitfires at the end of October. On October 27, in his second game back with the club, Brown recorded two goals and four points in a 7–2 win over the Sudbury Wolves. On November 11, Brown scored a hat-trick and added an assist in a 6–5 victory over the Kitchener Rangers.

In January 2018, Brown was traded to the Kitchener Rangers along with Austin McEneny in exchange for Grayson Ladd and a package of four draft picks. In 15 games with Windsor, Brown scored 13 goals and 24 points.

Kitchener Rangers
Brown played his first game with the Kitchener Rangers on January 26, 2018, earning three assists in a 6–2 win over the Saginaw Spirit. The next day, on January 27, Brown scored his first two goals with the Rangers against Garrett Forrest on the Flint Firebirds, and added an assist in a 5–3 victory. In his third game with Kitchener, on February 2, Brown recorded four assists in a 4–3 win over the Hamilton Bulldogs. On February 27, Brown earned another four point night, scoring two goals and two assists in a 6–3 win over the Sarnia Sting. In 17 games with the Rangers, Brown scored nine goals and 24 points, helping lead the club to their first division title since 2008.

On March 23, in his playoff debut with Kitchener, Brown earned an assist in a 7–2 victory over the Guelph Storm. In game four of the series, Brown earned three assists in a 6–4 loss to Guelph. In game six, Brown scored his first two OHL playoff goals against Anthony Popovich of the Storm, and added an assist in a 5–2 series clinching win. Overall, in 19 playoff games, Brown scored five goals and 27 points, as Kitchener lost to the Sault Ste. Marie Greyhounds in the Western Conference finals.

Professional

Ottawa Senators
On August 19, 2016, Brown signed a three-year, entry-level contract with the Ottawa Senators. Brown made his NHL debut with the Senators on October 5, 2017, against the Washington Capitals. He recorded his first NHL point, an assist, on October 21, 2017, in a game against the Toronto Maple Leafs. Brown was returned to Windsor later in the month having posted 1 assist in 4 games with the Senators. After attending the 2018 training camp with the Senators, Brown was assigned to the team's farm team in the American Hockey League, the Belleville Senators. Brown spent almost all of the season with Belleville except for two games with Ottawa, in which he did not score a point.

St. Louis Blues
On September 25, 2021, Brown was traded to the St. Louis Blues along with a conditional 4th round 2022 draft pick in exchange for Zach Sanford. Brown scored his first goal with the Blues in his first appearance for the team. On February 8, 2022 he signed a one-year contract extension with the Blues.

International play
While Brown played for Canada at the World U-17 Hockey Challenge in 2014, he chose to play with Team USA for the 2016 IIHF World U18 Championships with four of his other St. Louis friends he grew up playing hockey with. Accordingly, Brown will play international hockey with Team USA for the remainder of his career.

Personal life
Brown was born in Raleigh, North Carolina to a Canadian parent, and thus he possesses dual American/Canadian citizenship. His father, Jeff Brown was a former NHL player who played from 1985 to 1998.

Career statistics

Regular season and playoffs

International

References

External links
 
 

1998 births
American men's ice hockey centers
Belleville Senators players
Ice hockey people from Missouri
Ice hockey people from North Carolina
Kitchener Rangers players
Living people
National Hockey League first-round draft picks
Ottawa Senators draft picks
Ottawa Senators players
People from Chesterfield, Missouri
Sportspeople from Raleigh, North Carolina
Springfield Thunderbirds players
St. Louis Blues players
Windsor Spitfires players